Choriplacidae is a family of chitons belonging to the order Chitonida.

Genera:
 Choriplax Pilsbry, 1894
 Plasiochiton Hoare, 2000

References

Chitons